WEMF may refer to: 

WEMF AG für Werbemedienforschung, a Swiss media company
World Electronic Music Festival, an electronic music event held annually in Canada 
 a defunct radio station in Brighton Massachusetts during the 2010s